Radio Skala is a Bosnian local commercial radio station, broadcasting from Ugljevik, Bosnia and Herzegovina. This radio station broadcasts a variety of programs such as popular pop and folk music with local news.

Program is mainly produced in Serbian language at one FM frequency (Majevica ) and it is available in the city of Ugljevik near Bijeljina as well as in nearby municipalities in Semberija, Bosanska Posavina and Bosansko Podrinje area.

The owner of the local radio station is the company Lux Commerce" d.o.o. Ugljevik.

Estimated number of listeners of Radio Skala is around 107.906.

Frequencies
 Majevica

See also 
 List of radio stations in Bosnia and Herzegovina
 Daš Radio
 Daš Extra Radio
 BN Radio
 Bobar Radio
 Bobar Radio - Studio B2
 Radio Slobomir
 Radio Glas Drine

References

External links 
 www.skalaradio.net
 www.radiostanica.ba
 www.fmscan.org
 Communications Regulatory Agency of Bosnia and Herzegovina

Ugljevik
Radio stations established in 2000
Ugljevik
Mass media in Bijeljina